The legislative districts of Bulacan are the representations of the province of Bulacan in the various national legislatures of the Philippines. The province is currently represented in the lower house of the Congress of the Philippines through its first, second, third, fourth, fifth and sixth congressional districts.

Valenzuela (formerly Polo), now a highly urbanized city, was last represented as part of the province in 1972.

The component city of San Jose del Monte, while remaining an integral part of the province, was granted separate congressional representation in 2003.

History 
Bulacan was initially composed of one representative district, wherein it elected four representatives, at large, to the Malolos Congress in 1898; this lasted until 1899. It was later divided into two representative districts in 1907 for the Philippine Assembly. When seats for the upper house of the Philippine Legislature were elected from territory-based districts between 1916 and 1935, the province formed part of the third senatorial district which elected two out of the 24-member senate.

In the disruption caused by the Second World War, two delegates represented the province in the National Assembly of the Japanese-sponsored Second Philippine Republic: one was the provincial governor (an ex officio member), while the other was elected through a provincial assembly of KALIBAPI members during the Japanese occupation of the Philippines. Upon the restoration of the Philippine Commonwealth in 1945, the province retained its two pre-war representative districts.

Valenzuela, then a municipality, was separated from Bulacan to form the Metropolitan Manila Area on November 7, 1975 by virtue of Presidential Decree No. 824. Afterwards, the reduced province of Bulacan was represented in the Interim Batasang Pambansa as part of Region III from 1978 to 1984, and returned four representatives, elected at large, to the Regular Batasang Pambansa in 1984.

The province was reapportioned into four congressional districts under the new Constitution which was proclaimed on February 11, 1987, and elected members to the restored House of Representatives starting that same year.

The passage of Republic Act No. 9230. on December 18, 2003 separated from the fourth district the city of San Jose del Monte, which first elected its separate representative beginning in the 2004 elections. However, for the purposes of electing Sangguniang Panlalawigan members, the city remains part of the province's 4th Sangguniang Panlalawigan District.

Republic Act No. 9591, approved on May 1, 2009, sought to separate the city of Malolos from the first district to form its own congressional district starting in the 2010 elections. Like in the case of San Jose del Monte, the residents of Malolos would have remained as part of the province's 1st Sangguniang Panlalawigan district. However, on January 25, 2010, the Supreme Court declared the creation of the Legislative District of Malolos as unconstitutional, citing that the city's population at the time did not meet the minimum 250,000 count required by the constitution. Malolos today remains part of the first district.

Republic Act No. 11546, approved on May 26, 2021, reapportioned Bulacan into six (6) districts.
1st District: Malolos City, Bulakan, Calumpit, Hagonoy, Paombong, Pulilan
2nd District: Baliwag City, Bustos, Plaridel
3rd District: Doña Remedios Trinidad, San Ildefonso, San Miguel, San Rafael
4th District: Meycauayan City, Marilao, Obando
5th District: Balagtas, Bocaue, Guiguinto, Pandi
6th District: Angat, Norzagaray, Santa Maria

Current Districts 
The province was last redistricted in 2021, wherein the province gained two seats in the house. The province's current congressional delegation composes of three members of the  National Unity Party, one member of the  PDP-Laban, and two members of  Lakas-CMD.

Historical Districts

1898–1899 
 includes Polo

1943–1944 
 includes Polo

1984–1986

See also 
 Legislative district of San Jose del Monte
 Legislative districts of Valenzuela

References 

Bulacan
Politics of Bulacan